Kurbangozel Aliýewa (1 January 1908 1908 – 1975) was a Soviet politician who served as Minister of Light Industry of the Turkmen SSR.

She has been a member of the Communist Party of the Soviet Union beginning in 1936. She was elected as a deputy of the Supreme Soviet of the Turkmen SSR and a delegate of the Congress of the Communist Party of the Soviet Union.

References

1908 births
1975 deaths
20th-century Turkmenistan women politicians
20th-century Turkmenistan politicians
Soviet women in politics
Turkmenistan communists
Women government ministers of Turkmenistan
People's commissars and ministers of the Turkmen Soviet Socialist Republic